Reuben Crandol "Dummy" Stephenson (September 22, 1869 – December 1, 1924) was an American professional baseball first baseman and centerfielder of the late 19th century. He played in eight games as an outfielder for the Philadelphia Phillies of the National League in 1892.

Biography
Stephenson was born in the Petersburg section of Upper Township, New Jersey. He was given the nickname "Dummy" due to his deafness.

Stephenson's professional baseball career spanned 1892 to 1898, plus a final season in 1900. His major league experience was limited to eight games as a centerfielder for the Philadelphia Phillies in September 1892, during which he batted 10-for-37 (.270) with five runs batted in (RBIs). Stephenson then played in the Pennsylvania State League during 1893 and 1894 for three different teams. He spent 1895 in the New England League, 1896 in the Virginia League, 1897 back in the New England League, and 1898 in the New York State League. His final professional season was spent in the Atlantic League in 1900, after which he played in semi-professional leagues for several years. Statistics for most of Stephenson's minor league seasons are incomplete; he had a batting average over .300 per the limited records available. In addition to his primary positions as a centerfielder and first baseman, he pitched in at least one game during both the 1893 and 1894 seasons.

Stephenson died on December 1, 1924 in Trenton, New Jersey and was interred at the Union Cemetery in South Dennis, New Jersey; he was survived by his wife and three daughters.

Notes

References

External links 

1869 births
1924 deaths
Major League Baseball outfielders
Philadelphia Phillies players
19th-century baseball players
Baseball players from New Jersey
Reading Actives players
Harrisburg Senators players
Philadelphia Colts players
Fall River Indians players
Pawtucket Phenoms players
Norfolk Braves players
Portsmouth Browns players
Petersburg Farmers players
Hampton Clamdiggers players
Newport Colts players
Auburn Maroons players
Johnstown Mormans players
Palmyra Mormans players
Philadelphia Athletics (minor league) players
Harrisburg Ponies players
People from Upper Township, New Jersey
Sportspeople from Cape May County, New Jersey